Jimmy Mayasi (born June 6, 1987) is a retired Danish professional football forward of Congolese origins.

References

External links

1987 births
Living people
Danish men's footballers
Democratic Republic of the Congo footballers
Silkeborg IF players
AC Horsens players
Skive IK players
Tarxien Rainbows F.C. players
Brønshøj Boldklub players
Hvidovre IF players
Boldklubben Frem players
Danish Superliga players
Danish 1st Division players
Maltese Premier League players
Danish people of Democratic Republic of the Congo descent
Danish expatriate men's footballers
Expatriate footballers in Malta
People from Silkeborg
Association football forwards
AB Tårnby players
Fremad Valby players
Sportspeople from the Central Denmark Region